USS Me-Too (SP-155) was a motorboat that served in the United States Navy as a patrol vessel from 1917 to 1919.
 
Me-Too was built as a civilian motorboat in 1913 by Julius Ollsen at Dames Point, Florida. The U.S. Navy bought her from her owner, A. J. Shad of Jacksonville, Florida, on 8 May 1917 for use as a patrol boat during World War I. She was commissioned on 28 June 1917 at Jacksonville as USS Me-Too (SP-155).

Me-Too was assigned to the 6th Naval District, where she operated out of the section base at Jacksonville and patrolled the lower reaches of the St. Johns River. After the Armistice with Germany that ended the war on 11 November 1918, she remained at Jacksonville.

Me-Too was sold to Carl Worden on 1 December 1919.

References

Department of the Navy Naval Historical Center Online Library of Selected Images: Civilian Ships: Me-Too (Motor Boat, 1913). Served as USS Me-Too (SP-155) in 1917-1919
NavSource Online: Section Patrol Craft Photo Archive: Me-Too (SP 155)

Patrol vessels of the United States Navy
World War I patrol vessels of the United States
Ships built in Jacksonville, Florida
1913 ships